Mohamed Fatahollah Mardani (born 12 October 1972) is a Singaporean footballer, who currently plays for the club Balestier Khalsa FC. He is currently  years of age. Mohamed formerly played for another Singaporean club, Woodlands Wellington from 1996 to 1999. In 2003, he signed up for another Singaporean club, Home United where he stayed until 2005. In 2006, he began playing with the club Balestier Khalsa FC.

References

1972 births
Singaporean footballers
Association football defenders
Living people
Home United FC players